Česká Ves is a municipality and village in Jeseník District in the Olomouc Region of the Czech Republic. It has about 2,400 inhabitants.

Geography

Česká Ves lies in the valley of the river Bělá. The eastern part of the municipality is located in the Opawskie Mountains and the western part in the Golden Mountains.

History
The first written mention of Česká Ves is from 1416. A hamlet named Waltherowici, which was a predecessor of the current village, was documented in 1284.

The 17th century was tragic for Česká Ves. The village was hit by the plague epidemic in 1627, looted during the Thirty Years' War, and was at the centre of the infamous Northern Moravia witch trials, during which 16 women were burned.

According to the Austrian census of 1910 the village had 2,434 inhabitants, 2,419 of whom had permanent residence there. According to the census, all 2,419 permant residents spoke German as their native language. The most populous religious group were Roman Catholics with 2,417 (99.3%).

The municipality was severely hit by the 1997 Central European flood.

Economy
The main employer is the Řetězárna a.s company. It is a traditional Czech manufacturer of chains, founded in 1894.

Notable people
Johann Schroth (1798–1856), Austrian naturopath

References

External links

Villages in Jeseník District
Czech Silesia